Hydrothauma is a genus of African plants in the grass family.

The only known species is Hydrothauma manicatum, native to Zaïre and Zambia.

References

Panicoideae
Grasses of Africa
Monotypic Poaceae genera
Taxa named by Charles Edward Hubbard